The Broughton Peaks are a group of low mountain summits west of the south end of Effingham Inlet, to the north of Bamfield in the Barkley Sound region of the west coast of Vancouver Island, British Columbia, Canada.

Name origin

See also
Broughton (disambiguation)

References

West Coast of Vancouver Island
One-thousanders of British Columbia